Stephen Bambury (born 1951) is Christchurch-born, Auckland-based abstract painter.

After graduating from the Elam School of Fine Art at the University of Auckland, Bambury received two Queen Elizabeth II Arts Council Grants and a residency at Victoria College, in Melbourne, Australia.

Initially Bambury showed with the Petar/James Gallery as its youngest artist and later was to have a long-running relationship with Andrew Jensen, whose gallery hosted a number of exhibitions featuring Bambury. His abstract oils have "no decorative, naturalistic, metaphoric or autobiographical references or intents"

He is widely held in public art museums in New Zealand, with Te Papa having 15 pieces and correspondence, Auckland Art Gallery having 12 pieces and Christchurch Art Gallery 3 pieces.

References

Further reading 
 www.stephenbambury.co.nz

1951 births
Artists from Christchurch
New Zealand painters
Abstract painters
Living people
Artists from Auckland
University of Auckland alumni